Eunoe papillaris is a scale worm described from south of Tasmania in the Southern Ocean at a depths of about 1600m.

Description
Number of segments 37; elytra 15 pairs. Dorsum light, yellowish; ventrum centrally brown, parapodial and cirral tips purple. Prostomium anterior margin comprising a pair of acute anterior projections. Lateral antennae inserted ventrally (beneath prostomium and median antenna). Notochaetae about as thick as neurochaetae. Bidentate neurochaetae absent.

References

Phyllodocida